Biksti Parish is an administrative unit of Dobele Municipality, Latvia.

Towns, villages and settlements of Biksti Parish 
Biksti
Bikstu Stacija
Jaunā Māja
Līvi
Mazbiksti
Upenieki

References 

Dobele Municipality
Parishes of Latvia